"Like Strangers" is a song written by Boudleaux Bryant, which was a hit single for The Everly Brothers in 1960. The song was later a country hit for Gail Davies in 1980.

The Everly Brothers version
The Everly Brothers released the song on their album The Fabulous Style of the Everly Brothers in spring of 1960, and as a single in autumn of that year. It spent 10 weeks on the Billboard Hot 100 chart, peaking at No. 22, while reaching No. 11 on the United Kingdom's Record Retailer chart, and No. 32 on Canada's CHUM Hit Parade.

Chart performance

Gail Davies version
Gail Davies released a cover of the song in 1980 as a single and on the album The Game. Davies' version reached No. 21 on the Billboard "Hot Country Singles" chart, No. 17 on the Record World Country Singles chart, No. 20 on the Cash Box Top 100 Country chart, and No. 52 on Canada's RPM Country 75 Singles chart.

References

1960 songs
1960 singles
The Everly Brothers songs
Songs written by Felice and Boudleaux Bryant
Cadence Records singles